Mahalleh-ye Zoshk may refer to:
 Mahalleh-ye Zoshk-e Olya
 Mahalleh-ye Zoshk-e Sofla